Anis Ajroud (born 30 March 2002) is a Tunisian professional footballer who plays as a winger for Ajaccio.

Club career
Ajroud began playing football at the youth academy of Nice and after four years moved to Cavigal Nice for the 2018–19 season. He then transferred to the youth academy of Ajaccio in 2019 and was promoted to their reserves in 2020. He made his professional debut with Ajaccio in a 2–0 Ligue 2 loss to Caen on 24 January 2022, coming on as a substitute in the 85th minute.

International career
Ajroud debuted for the Tunisia U23s for a set of friendlies in May 2022.

References

External links
 

2002 births
Living people
People from Sousse Governorate
Tunisian footballers
Association football wingers
Tunisia youth international footballers
AC Ajaccio players
Ligue 2 players
Championnat National 3 players
Tunisian expatriate footballers
Tunisian expatriate sportspeople in France
Expatriate footballers in France